Bridge L8515 is a historic bridge in the Oatmeal Hill neighborhood of Duluth, Minnesota, United States.  Built in 1922, it carries Lewis Street over Tischer Creek.  Structurally it is a reinforced concrete arch bridge with a veneer of local gabbro masonry.  Bridge L8515 was listed on the National Register of Historic Places in 2016 for its local significance in the theme of engineering.  It was nominated for being a highly aesthetic example of the rustic bridges built in park-like settings in the first half of the 20th century.

See also
 List of bridges on the National Register of Historic Places in Minnesota
 National Register of Historic Places listings in St. Louis County, Minnesota

References

External links
 Bridge L8515–Minnesota Department of Transportation

1922 establishments in Minnesota
Bridges completed in 1922
Buildings and structures in Duluth, Minnesota
Concrete bridges in Minnesota
Deck arch bridges in the United States
National Register of Historic Places in St. Louis County, Minnesota
Road bridges on the National Register of Historic Places in Minnesota
Rustic architecture in Minnesota
Transportation in Duluth, Minnesota